Yinon Cohen, an Israeli sociologist, is the Yosef Hayim Yerushalmi Professor of Israel and Jewish Studies at Columbia University.

Cohen holds a B.A. from Hebrew University in Jerusalem and an M.A and Ph.D. from SUNY at Stony Brook.

He is known for his research on international migration, social stratification, and labor markets. He has studied earnings assimilation of immigrants in Israel, Germany, and the United States; socioeconomic ethnic and gender gaps in Israel; income inequality in Israel; and industrial relations in Israel.

Cohen's appointment to the Yerushalmi chair was controversial because he had criticised Israeli policy and because the search committee included two prominent critics of Israel.
He is described by The Forward as "lean[ing] leftward on Israeli politics".

References

Israeli academics
Living people
Year of birth missing (living people)
Columbia University faculty
Hebrew University of Jerusalem alumni